Graham Birks (born 25 January 1942) is an English former footballer who played as a full back.

Playing career
Birks progressed through the youth ranks to make four appearances in the Football League First Division for Sheffield Wednesday. He moved to Peterborough United in 1964 and then played more than 100 league games for Southend United.

Early in 1969–70, Birks signed for Chester. He remained at Sealand Road until 1972, when he joined South African side Port Elizabeth City. He later returned to England and played for Fleetwood Town.

References

1942 births
Living people
Footballers from Sheffield
English footballers
Association football fullbacks
Sheffield Wednesday F.C. players
Peterborough United F.C. players
Southend United F.C. players
Chester City F.C. players
Port Elizabeth City F.C. players
Fleetwood Town F.C. players
English Football League players
English expatriate footballers